Alp may refer to:
 Alp, any mountain in the Alps
 Alp (name)
 Alp (folklore), a supernatural being in German folklore
 Alp, Spain, a town and municipality in Catalonia, Spain
 Alp (river), a river in Schwyz, Switzerland
 Alpine pasture or alp
 Alpine meadow or alp
 Alıp or Alp, an Ottoman title

See also
 ALP (disambiguation)
 Alp 2500, a ski resort in Catalonia, Spain
 Alps (disambiguation)
 ALPS (disambiguation)